Bojan Mihajlović (born 16 December 1973) is a Serbian former footballer who played as a midfielder.

His previous clubs include FK Dubočica, OFK Beograd, FK Radnički Niš, FK Belasica, FK Rabotnički Kometal and FK Metalurg Skopje.

Achievements
Rabotnicki Skopje
Macedonian League: 3
Winner:2004–05,2005-06, 2007-08
Macedonian Cup: 1
Winner:2007-08
Metalurg Skopje
Macedonian Cup: 1
Winner:2010-11

External links
  
 Profile at FFM

1973 births
Living people
Serbian footballers
Serbian expatriate footballers
Association football midfielders
OFK Beograd players
FK Radnički Niš players
FK Belasica players
FK Rabotnički players
Expatriate footballers in North Macedonia
Serbian expatriate sportspeople in North Macedonia